Ernest Ashley Dingo AM (born 31 July 1956) is an Indigenous Australian actor, television presenter and comedian, originating from the Yamatji people of the Murchison region of Western Australia. He is a designated Australian National Living Treasure.

Background
Born Ernest Ashley Dingo on 31 July 1956, at Bullardoo Station, Dingo was the second child of nine, with three brothers and five sisters. He grew up in Mullewa, Western Australia with his family. Ernie's younger brother Murray died in a car accident in August 2007. 

He attended both Prospect Primary School and Geraldton High School in his hometown in Western Australia.

Dingo got his first big break in acting after moving to Perth and meeting Richard Walley, with whom he played basketball in a local team. He then went on to play state league first division for the East Perth Hawks. He completed an apprenticeship in sign writing.

Career
Ernie rose to fame when he controversially collaborated with Richard Walley to create the first public performance of the "Welcome to Country" ceremony in Perth in 1976, after dancers from the Pacific islands would not perform without one. As Australia's National Living Treasure, he promoted the Generation One "Hand Across Australia", which was a promotion for Indigenous Recognition and Equal Rights.

Film
Dingo's film career began in the early 1980s and he appeared regularly on screen through the 1990s. He starred in the title role in the 1987 docu-drama biopic Tudawali and appeared in Bruce Beresford's 1987 drama The Fringe Dwellers.  He had a major supporting role in the international comedy blockbuster Crocodile Dundee II in 1988. He appeared as himself in the 1989 comedy Capuccino and had a major role in the 1991 Wim Wenders film Until the End of the World. In 1993 he starred in Blackfellas and had a lead role in 1996's Dead Heart. In 1998 he starred in Somewhere in the Darkness. In 2010 he returned to the silver screen with a role in the Aboriginal musical Bran Nue Dae along with Jessica Mauboy and Geoffrey Rush.

Television and other appearances
Dingo's first minor big break in television was in 1989 in the first season of Channel 7 sketch comedy TV show Fast Forward (1989–1992).

As an actor, he has also appeared in many Australian television series such as Blue Heelers, The Flying Doctors, Heartbreak High and Rafferty's Rules. He appeared in the TV mini-series The Cowra Breakout (1984), A Waltz Through the Hills (1987), (for which he won an AFI Award for Best Actor in a Television Drama) and Kings in Grass Castles (1997), as well as co-starring with Cate Blanchett in the Australian television drama series Heartland (known as Burned Bridges in the United States).

He hosted the television program The Great Outdoors for 16 years from its beginning in 1993 to its end in 2009.

Dingo narrated the Indigenous segment of the 2000 Olympic Games opening ceremony in Sydney, New South Wales.

In May 2007, Dingo appeared as one of the celebrity performers on the celebrity singing competition reality show It Takes Two. Dingo also hosted the first series of No Leave, No Life, on Channel Seven.

In February 2012 Dingo and his family were featured in episode three of the Australian Broadcasting Corporation (ABC) documentary series Family Confidential.

He appears in an episode of Serangoon Road, an Australian-Singaporean television drama series which premiered on 22 September 2013 on the ABC and HBO Asia. Also in 2013, Dingo plays a Vietnam veteran, a retired Army drill sergeant facing his demons in episode six of the second series of Redfern Now, Dogs of War. The episode was shown at the Adelaide Film Festival in October 2013. In 2018 he played Keith Groves in the TV miniseries Mystery Road.

Dingo hosted the travel show 'Going Places with Ernie Dingo', that is on free to air TV in Australia.

In 2022 he performed in a celebrity tribute to Australian comedian and actor Paul Hogan, Roast of Paul Hogan, which was broadcast on Australia’s Seven Network.

Personal life
Dingo's eldest daughter, Carrleen, was born when he was 18; through her, he has two grandchildren.

Ernie Dingo married Sally Butler, then a sales representative for 2Day FM, in 1989. The couple struggled to conceive their own children via IVF in the early 90's and later adopted a daughter, Wilara and took care of one of their grandchildren. In his appearance on Family Confidential Dingo revealed that Wilara's father was another Aboriginal actor who was actually Dingo's cousin, David Ngoombujarra. Dingo discovered in 2004 that he had a daughter, named Zoe, from a brief relationship before his marriage.

Sally Dingo has authored two books about her husband and family, 2000's Ernie Dingo: King of the Kids and Dingo, The Story of our Mob in 1997. Their marriage broke down in 2011 and Dingo moved to Perth.

Dingo fathered twin boys in 2015.

Dingo is a prominent supporter of Australian rules football, and in particular the Australian Football League's West Coast Eagles. 

In 2020, Dingo toured regional Western Australia to speak to Indigenous groups, which had the lowest vaccination rates in WA. This led to him receiving threats.

Dingo is a fan of basketball and played at state level in 1973 for the Perth Wildcats. He will join the masters games to play the game for Australia in 2022.

Awards and honours
Ernie Dingo was made a Member of the Order of Australia in 1990, in recognition of his service to the performing arts.

He received the AFI Award for Best Performance by an Actor in a Leading Role in a Tele feature for A Waltz Through the Hills in 1988, after being nominated the previous year for Tudawali.  He has also been nominated for an AFI/AACTA Award for Best Actor in a Leading Role in a Television Drama in 1994 for Heartland and in 2013 for Redfern Now.

Controversy
In 2008, Dingo and radio host Kyle Sandilands had a feud after Sandilands used the line "a dingo ate my baby" in a promo leading up to Dingo's appearance on his show. The two patched things up and KIIS FM donated $10,000 to the Mullewa Football Club in WA.

In December 2009, Ernie made controversial comments hitting out at "hypocritical white people who lecture Aborigines about alcohol consumption". "What you should be worrying about is who is giving them access... who sells alcohol? Not black people," Dingo said. We [Indigenous people] don't have a problem. Our problem is to say 'no' to you blokes, to white people... 'no' is not really part of our cultural background." "There are more white alcoholics than there are black people in this country, so don't come at us with restrictions and Aboriginal laws about alcohol. It upsets me a lot. I'm passionate about the fact that people talk – journalists talk – about Aboriginal people with our drinking problem. We don't have a drinking problem at all... [The] Aboriginal drinking problem is white people selling to them."

In August 2010, the WA Police Force announced they had opened an investigation into reports of child abuse by Dingo. It was alleged that Dingo slapped and verbally abused an 11-year boy at Carnarvon Primary School, and then made abusive comments singling out that particular boy while speaking at a school assembly shortly afterward. Dingo denied the claims, saying: "I deny it, but until there is an outcome I can't really talk about it." He entered a plea of not guilty by endorsement in a letter to the court and a date of 3 February 2011 was set for trial in Carnarvon. However, on 18 April 2011, following a mediation session, the assault charge was dropped and the matter formally withdrawn.

In 2010, two women from New South Wales and Victoria claimed to have engaged in affairs with Dingo. It was subsequently reported that Ernie and Sally were living in an open marriage for the sake of their children. The claim of an open marriage was found to be false and was retracted.

References

Bibliography
 Dingo, Sally. Dingo, The Story of our Mob. Random House Australia, 1997. .
 Dingo, Sally. Ernie Dingo: King of the Kids. Random House Australia, 2000. .

External links
 

Living people
1956 births
20th-century Australian male actors
21st-century Australian male actors
AACTA Award winners
Australian male film actors
Australian male television actors
Australian television presenters
Indigenous Australian male actors
Indigenous Australians from Western Australia
Members of the Order of Australia
People from Mullewa, Western Australia
Racism in Australia
Didgeridoo players